Itampolo is a town and commune in southwestern Madagascar. It belongs to the district of Ampanihy, which is a part of Atsimo-Andrefana Region. The population of the commune was estimated to be approximately 32,000 in 2001 commune census.

Only primary schooling is available. The majority 60% of the population of the commune are farmers, while an additional 20% receives their livelihood from raising livestock. The most important crops are cassava and peas, while other important agricultural products are maize and sweet potatoes.  Services provide employment for 5% of the population. Additionally fishing employs 15% of the population.

References and notes 

Populated places in Atsimo-Andrefana